The SPSh-44 (26-мм сигнальный пистолет СПШ-44) is a Soviet signal pistol.

History 
The gun was designed by G. S. Shpagin as a replacement for the previous models of the Red Army signal pistol.

In 1943 he made first version of the gun - 26mm SPSh-43 flare (signal) pistol (26-мм осветительный (сигнальный) пистолет СПШ-43). In January 1944, The second version of this pistol was made - SPSh-2 (СПШ-2). 

After tests and trials, in 1944 SPSh-2 flare gun was officially adopted as the new standard Red Army signal pistol. In May 1944 it began mass production as SPSh-44 signal pistol.

Later it became the standard flare gun in all Warsaw Pact countries.

In the mid-1970s, experimental cartridges for immobilization of wild animals for SPSh-44 signal pistol were made and tested.

Design 
The SPSh-44 is a single-shot break-action smoothbore flare gun.

Variants 
 OSSh-42 (ОСШ-42) - the first test prototype with 140mm barrel (1.09 kg)
 Pistolet sygnałowy wz. 1944 - copy of SPSh-44, made since 1948 by Zakłady Metalowe im. gen. "Waltera" in Polish People's Republic
 Type 57 - copy of SPSh-44, made in the People's Republic of China

 Keserű Muvek Rubber Protector - is a single-shot traumatic pistol manufactured by the Hungarian company " Keserű "  by reworking the SPSh. It has separate loading with a 28-mm rubber bullet and a blank cartridge .380 Knall, and can be owned without lincense in Hungary

Users

References

Bibliography
 26-мм сигнальный пистолет (СПШ) обр. 1944 г. Руководство службы / Гл. артил. упр. Вооруж. Сил СССР. Moscow: Voenizdat, 1946 (тип. им. Тимошенко)
 26-мм сигнальный пистолет (СПШ) обр. 1944 г. Руководство службы / Воен. м-во СССР. Moscow: Voenizdat, 1950 (тип. им. Тимошенко)
 26-мм сигнальный пистолет (СПШ) обр. 1944 г. Руководство службы / Воен. м-во СССР. Mоscow: Voenizdat, 1952
 Дополнение к руководству службы. 26-мм сигнальный пистолет (СПШ) обр. 1944 г. - 1979 г.

External links
 SPSh Flare Pistol / Internet Movie Firearms Database

Pistols of the Soviet Union
Flare guns
Izhevsk Mechanical Plant products